

L02A Hormones and related agents

L02AA Estrogens
L02AA01 Diethylstilbestrol
L02AA02 Polyestradiol phosphate
L02AA03 Ethinylestradiol
L02AA04 Fosfestrol

L02AB Progestogens
L02AB01 Megestrol
L02AB02 Medroxyprogesterone
L02AB03 Gestonorone

L02AE Gonadotropin-releasing hormone analogues
L02AE01 Buserelin
L02AE02 Leuprorelin
L02AE03 Goserelin
L02AE04 Triptorelin
L02AE05 Histrelin
L02AE51 Leuprorelin and bicalutamide

L02AX Other hormones

L02B Hormone antagonists and related agents

L02BA Anti-estrogens
L02BA01 Tamoxifen
L02BA02 Toremifene
L02BA03 Fulvestrant

L02BB Anti-androgens
L02BB01 Flutamide
L02BB02 Nilutamide
L02BB03 Bicalutamide
L02BB04 Enzalutamide
L02BB05 Apalutamide
L02BB06 Darolutamide

L02BG Aromatase inhibitors
L02BG01 Aminogluthetimide
L02BG02 Formestane
L02BG03 Anastrozole
L02BG04 Letrozole
L02BG05 Vorozole
L02BG06 Exemestane

L02BX Other hormone antagonists and related agents
L02BX01 Abarelix
L02BX02 Degarelix
L02BX03 Abiraterone
L02BX04 Relugolix

References

L02